Penelope Lea is a Norwegian climate activist who became the second-youngest ambassador for UNICEF at the age of 15.

Activism
Lea is from Kjelsås, Oslo. Her mother is a children's book writer. When she was eight, Lea joined the Eco-Agents, a youth climate group. She gave her first speech aged nine at a Nature and Youth national camp. She was elected as a board member of the Eco-Agents when she was 11. At twelve, Lea was one of seven people to join the Children's Climate Panel, founded by the Eco-Agents.

In 2019, Lea became a climate advisor to Knut Storberget and was a youth ambassador for Norway at the UNICEF summit for World Children's Day. In October 2019, Lea became the first climate ambassador for UNICEF; her age of 15 made her the second-youngest UNICEF ambassador in history. She was the fifth Norwegian ambassador and the first to be appointed since 2007. At the 2019 United Nations Climate Change Conference (COP25), Lea was one of five child activists to speak at an event organized by UNICEF and the OHCHR.

Books

References

Further reading
 
 
 
 

Living people
Climate activists
Norwegian activists
Norwegian women activists
People from Oslo
UNICEF Goodwill Ambassadors
Women activists
Year of birth missing (living people)
2000s births